Rustam Abdurashitovich Khalnazarov (born 20 July 2000) is a Russian football player who plays for FC Krasnodar and FC Krasnodar-2.

Club career
He made his debut in the Russian Professional Football League for FC Krasnodar-2 on 16 May 2018 in a game against FC Afips Afipsky. He made his Russian Football National League debut for Krasnodar-2 on 17 July 2018 in a game against FC Sibir Novosibirsk.

Khalnazarov made his Russian Premier League debut for FC Krasnodar on 29 July 2022 against FC Ural Yekaterinburg.

Career statistics

References

External links
 
 
 
 

2000 births
Sportspeople from Novosibirsk
Living people
Russian footballers
Russia youth international footballers
Association football forwards
Russian First League players
Russian Second League players
Russian Premier League players
FC Krasnodar-2 players
FC Krasnodar players